Elytroleptus similis is a species of beetle in the family Cerambycidae. It was described by Chemsak & Linsley in 1965.

References

Elytroleptus
Beetles described in 1965